Kudunuru is a small village in Cherla mandal of Khammam district in Andhra Pradesh. The Godavari river is very near to the village.

References

Villages in Khammam district